Thomas M. Victor (born 1961/1962) is an American guitarist, singer, songwriter, and producer. He is best known as the lead singer and guitarist for heavy metal band Prong, which he founded in New York City in 1986, as well as the guitarist for heavy metal band Danzig intermittently since 1996 and full-time since 2008.

Biography

In the late 1980s, Victor worked as a sound engineer at the music club CBGB in New York City. After the release of Rude Awakening in 1996, Prong disbanded and Victor moved to Los Angeles, but later revived the band to release new Prong records. He took a break from Prong during which he worked alongside rock musicians including Rob Zombie, Marilyn Manson, Trent Reznor, and Glenn Danzig. 

Since 2012's Carved into Stone, Prong have been very active again, releasing albums and touring regularly. 2013 saw the band release their Official Bootleg – Unleashed in the West album which featured re-recordings of 17 classic Prong tracks. The next studio album, Ruining Lives was released in 2014, and 2015 saw the band release their first covers album entitled Songs from the Black Hole. 

Victor is also part of the hard rock, heavy metal, hardcore punk and punk rock supergroup Teenage Time Killers.

Victor has toured and recorded with Ministry and Danzig. He has also provided guest vocals for the Soulfly album Omen. He contributed to the Argyle Park album Misguided, and wrote the main riff for the song "Doomsayer", which he later used on the Prong song "Controller".

Equipment

Victor has been endorsed by Schecter Guitar Research ever since reuniting with Prong, using both an S-1 and C-1 in early live performances. He would later on start using their Devil guitar, which would be the basis for his second signature model. In 2013, his first signature model would be released, based on the newly introduced Banshee series, but with a mahogany body and neck, ebony fretboard, EMG pickups, and custom inlays. In 2015, his second signature model was introduced, based on the Devil series guitar and with similar specifications to his first signature model, but with black nickel hardware, and a single 12th-fret Prong inlay.

Before using Schecter, Victor relied on several guitars, most famously a Charvel Surfcaster. Other guitars he used around that era were a Charvel LSX, Charvel Predator, and Gibson SG Custom. Around the release of Rude Awakening, and before Prong's breakup, he was endorsed by Fernandes Guitars, using both a Vertigo and Deuce WS model.

References

External links

1960s births
20th-century American guitarists
Alternative metal musicians
American heavy metal guitarists
American heavy metal singers
American industrial musicians
American male singers
American male guitarists
Danzig (band) members
Guitarists from New York City
Industrial metal musicians
Living people
Ministry (band) members
New York (state) Republicans
Prong (band) members
Singers from New York City